Giuseppe "Peppino" Meazza (23 August 1910 – 21 August 1979), also known as il Balilla, was an Italian football manager and player. Throughout his career, he played mainly for Inter Milan in the 1930s, scoring 242 goals in 365 games for the club, and winning three Serie A titles, as well as the Coppa Italia; he later also played for local rivals Milan, as well as Turin rivals Juventus, in addition to his spells with Varese and Atalanta. At international level, he led Italy to win two consecutive World Cups: in 1934 on home soil, and in 1938 as captain, being named to the All-star Team. Meazza is widely considered one of the greatest footballers of all time, as well as being regarded by many in the sport as Italy's greatest ever player. Giuseppe Prisco and Gianni Brera considered him to be the greatest footballer of all time.

Along with Giovanni Ferrari, Guido Masetti and Eraldo Monzeglio, he is one of only four Italian players to have won two World Cups. Following his retirement, he served as a coach for the Italy national team, and with several Italian clubs, including his former club sides Inter and Atalanta, as well as Pro Patria, and Turkish club Beşiktaş; he was Italy's head coach at the 1952 Summer Olympics.

Due to his technical skill, prolific goalscoring, and creative ability, he was often given the nickname "il genio" (the genius) by the Italian press during his career. He has been ranked fourth-best player in the history of the World Cup. A prolific forward, Meazza won the Serie A top-scorer award on three occasions in his career; with 216 goals in Serie A, he is the fourth all-time highest goal scorer in Serie A, alongside José Altafini, and with 33 goals, he is also the second highest goalscorer for the Italian national team. With 338 goals, he is the third-highest Italian goalscorer in all competitions. He is also the youngest player ever to score 100 goals in Serie A, a feat which he achieved at the age of 23 years and 32 days. San Siro, the principal stadium in his native city of Milan, which is today shared by two of his former clubs, Inter Milan and crosstown rivals A.C. Milan, was named Stadio Giuseppe Meazza in the player's honour on 3 March 1980. In 2011, he was posthumously inducted into the Italian Football Hall of Fame. Throughout his career, including friendlies, Meazza scored 537 goals.

Early life
Meazza was born in Porta Vittoria, Milan. Having lost his father in 1917 during the fighting of World War I at the age of seven, Peppe grew up in Milan with his mother, Ersilia who came from Mediglia, helping her sell fruit at the market. He began playing football at six years old, and started out playing barefoot with a ball made of rags on the streets for a team named the "Maestri Campionesi". At the age of twelve, his mother gave him permission to pursue a footballing career, and he began playing for Gloria F.C.. It was during this time that a fan gave Meazza his first pair of football boots.

At the age of 14, Meazza admired Milan, but was rejected by the team for his small physique. However, he was instead accepted by Milan's cross-city rivals Inter Milan.

Meazza's nickname, "il Balilla" ("The Little Boy"), was given to him in 1927 by his older teammate Leopoldo Conti, who thought "Peppìn", in Milanese dialect, who was only 17 when he joined the senior team, was too young to be associated to the senior team. He was surprised after Inter coach Árpád Weisz decided to give Meazza his debut for Inter in his place, commenting: "Now we even let the Balilla kids play!" The Opera Nazionale Balilla, the Fascist youth organisation which collected all children aged eight to 14 years, was established in 1926, hence why Conti felt it to be a suitable nickname for the young rookie. However, Meazza later scored two goals on his official debut, leaving Conti speechless.

Club career

Inter 
Meazza scored two goals on his professional debut, which came in a 6–2 win against Milanese Unione Sportiva in the Coppa Volta di Como, on 12 September 1927. The following day, the Italian sports newspaper La Gazzetta dello Sport praised his game as "intelligent, fresh, quick". Meazza still holds the record for the most goals scored in a debut season in Serie A, with 31 goals in his first season (1929–30). The next season, he scored five goals in a single game, twice in one season: 6 January 1929 Inter against Pistoiese 9–1 and 17 March 1929 Inter v Verona 9–0. That same season (1928–29) on 12 May 1929, he scored six goals as Inter beat Venezia 10–2. 27 April 1930 was the first time Inter ever played A.S. Roma in Milan. Inter won 6–0 and Meazza scored four goals, scoring his first three within three minutes of the game.

With Meazza in the squad, Inter won three national championships in 1930, 1938 and 1940, and helped win the team's first Coppa Italia in 1939. In the 1930 deciding game, he scored a second half hat-trick to tie the game against Genoa after Inter had been down 3–0. He was top-scorer of Serie A three times (1930, 1936, 1938), top-scorer in the pre-Serie A year of 1929 and top scorer of the Mitropa Cup three times: 1930 (seven goals), 1933 (five goals) and 1936 (ten goals); he finished with a runners-up medal in the competition in 1933.

When Ambrosiana beat Bari in the 1937–38 championship, he scored five goals in a 9–2 victory. The next week he scored a hat-trick against Lucchese. Along with fellow Inter players Ferraris II, Ferrari, and Locatelli, Meazza was involved in the Azzurri set-up that won the 1938 World Cup in Paris. That same year, Inter won their fourth Scudetto, while the club's first Coppa Italia success came in 1939.

AC Milan and later career 
An injury put him out of action for most of 1938–39 and 1939–40, and after having devoted the best part of his career to Inter, Meazza transferred to A.C. Milan on 28 November 1940. Later in his career he also played for Juventus, A.S. Varese 1910 and Atalanta Bergamo. His debut for Juventus, on 18 October 1942, took place in the derby against Torino. This was the last season in which he managed to record double figures in terms of goals scored, helping Juventus to a third–place finish in the league. Following this season the Serie A and Coppa Italia were suspended due to the Second World War.

Return to Inter 
In 1946 he was recalled to Inter as a player-coach. He played 17 games, scoring the last two goals of his career to help an Inter team that was in danger of relegation.

International career
Meazza played for Italy national team in the 1934 and 1938 World Cups, both of which Italy won. Apart from captaining the World Cup winning team in 1938, Meazza, along with Giovanni Ferrari and Eraldo Monzeglio, also set a record for being the only Italian players to win two World Cups.

Early career 
His debut with the Italy national team was in Rome on 9 February 1930 against Switzerland. Then 19-year-old, Meazza scored twice in that game (in the 37th and 39th minutes) to help Italy to a 4–2 victory after they had been down by two goals in only 19 minutes. The next game Italy played was on 2 March 1930 against Germany in Frankfurt, where Meazza scored a goal in a 2–0 win. A few months later, on 11 May 1930, he scored a hat-trick in a 5–0 game as Italy beat Hungary of Larcos, Hirzer and Pál Titkos for the first time ever while playing in Budapest. Meazza helped Italy win the Central European International Cup that year; the cup was a three-year international tournament between the strongest national teams of central and eastern Europe.

On 25 January 1931, Meazza scored another three goals in a 5–0 friendly win against France. He also scored two goals in the 1931–32 Central European International Cup campaign, in which Italy finished in second place.

His first fifteen caps were at centre-forward, but in 1933, he showed his versatility during a 3–1 victory over Germany in Bologna, when he was moved to an inside-right position by the Italian coach Vittorio Pozzo, to accommodate teammate Angelo Schiavio, a switch that would help Italy win the World Cup the next year as the goals flowed in. During the tournament, Meazza once again demonstrated his adaptability when he was switched to an inside-left.

1934 FIFA World Cup 
In the 1934 World Cup, which was hosted by Italy, Meazza appeared in every game for the Italians. On 25 March 1934 in Milan, Italy beat Greece 4–0 in a qualifying match with two goals coming from Meazza. He then scored the final goal in their 7–1 victory over the United States in the 89th minute in their World Cup opener. In the game against Spain, Giovanni Ferrari scored a goal against Ricardo Zamora. The game ended 1–1 and had to be settled the next day. Meazza scored from a corner sent in by Raimundo Orsi in the 11th minute. It was the only goal of the game.

The final against Czechoslovakia in Rome's Stadio Nazionale PNF. After 90 minutes, the two teams were at 1–1. Italy, though, was in far more trouble as the game went into extra-time, until Meazza became the inspirer again. His injury became a mixed blessing as the Czechs did not bother to mark him and he made them rue that decision. In the 5th minute of extra time, Schiavio hit a snap-shot past goalkeeper Frantisek Planicka for the winner. Meazza was elected into the All-Star Team of the tournament and won the Golden Ball, the award presented to the best player at each FIFA World Cup finals.

1933–35 Central European International Cup 
In 1935 he claimed the Central European International Cup again. Alongside Eraldo Monzeglio, Raimundo Orsi, Raffaele Costantino, Alfredo Pitto, Umberto Caligaris, Luigi Allemandi, Virginio Rosetta & Gianpiero Combi, Meazza is one of only nine (all Italian) players to win two editions of the Central European International Cup (1927–30 and 1933–35); he also finished as the runner-up once with Italy (1931–32), thereby winning two gold medals and a silver medal before the tournament was discontinued due to the Anschluss. He holds the all-time record for appearances and goals, sixteen and eight respectively, at Central European International Cup tournaments for the Italian national side. With 8 goals, he is among the all-time top goal scorers in the competition's history.

1938 FIFA World Cup and later career 
In the 1938 World Cup hosted by France, Meazza captained Italy, again playing in every match. In the semi-final against Brazil, with the score at 1–0 Italy were awarded a penalty after Silvio Piola was fouled by Domingos da Guia. As Meazza stepped up to take the kick, with a chance to double his team's lead, his shorts fell down, as the elastic in them had ripped; he held them up with his left hand, but he still managed to score, beating the Brazilian goalkeeper Walter from the spot by placing the ball into the corner. The goal enabled Italy to win the match 2–1 and sent them into their second consecutive World Cup final.

In the final, the Italians faced Hungary. Meazza set up goals for Silvio Piola and Gino Colaussi before halftime. The first assist he gave came after a quick exchange with Colaussi, who put Italy up 1–0. The next assist came after he faked a shot, making his defender jump past him, and dribbled past another defender, before sending in a quick pass on the ground for Piola to score. Ten minutes before halftime, after another quick exchange between Ferrari and Meazza, the latter found the unmarked Colaussi with a pass, and the winger netted his second of the game to make it 3–1 at the break. After the tournament, Piola, who scored five goals in France, paid his colleague the compliment of being responsible for his own good performance: "At the FIFA World Cup, I mainly lived off Meazza and Ferrari".

He played his last match for the national nine years after his debut, on 20 July 1939 at the Olympiastadion in Helsinki, when he captained Italy to a 3–2 win over Finland. In total, he played 53 times with Italy between 1930 and 1939, losing only six matches, and scoring 33 goals; he is currently Italy's second highest goalscorer, behind Luigi Riva.

Style of play

Although he was initially deployed as full-back in his youth, Meazza began his professional career as an all out striker or centre forward, but he later played for more than half of his career as a creative inside left forward, known as the mezzala role in Italian football jargon, although he was also capable of playing on the right. He further demonstrated his skill and creative ability by also becoming an accomplished attacking midfielder, and even played as a central midfielder or as a deep-lying playmaker in his later career. He was known for his excellent shooting ability and intoxicating dribbling skills, with an eye for the final pass. Despite his average height and slight yet stocky build, he was also an exceptional header of the ball, and was known for his acrobatic abilities in the air. Beyond his qualities as a player, he was also a great leader on the pitch.

Meazza was the first Italian football player who became famous worldwide, and was the first player with personal sponsors. Unlike his more reserved friend, international teammate, and club-rival Silvio Piola, a player with whom Meazza was often compared, he was known for having a much more flamboyant character both on and off the pitch. He loved his cabriolet, champagne and women and was the only player on the national team that was allowed to smoke. Meazza was famous for humiliating the best defenders of the era and for sleeping at a brothel the night before a match. With his plush touch on the ball, he would cause panic in the robust defenders from an era where two footed tackles from behind were often waved on. Not known for having a particularly high work-rate, sometimes he would not get out of bed until his teammates were already finished training. He also loved the Tango and used this proficiency to make him unpredictable on the field and could score goals at fox-trot tempo. 

He was a superb dribbler who despite his speed, never had a single brylcreemed hair out of place, and although he was not tall, was remarkably good in the air. Meazza created many chances for his teammates and scored goals as well. His bending goals "a foglia morta", the "dead leaf technique", in particular from free-kicks, were also feared by goalkeepers. As an offensive playmaker, he was a brilliant passer, two-footed, had remarkable field vision, and was noted for his balance and agility on the ball, as well as his control, turns and spins.

His trademark goals were ones where he would collect the ball at the half-line, dribble through several opponents with a series of twinkle-toed shuffles, and turns, until arriving in front of the goal, where he would stop and invite the goalkeeper to attack him like a matador, before faking a shot, then dribbling past the beaten goalkeeper to slot home easily. In away games, the defenders would often foul and hack him to avoid being humiliated. "Gol alla Meazza" and "finte alla Meazza" have since become popular sayings for Italian football fans to describe a truly inspiring goal off the dribble or a series of jukes. His goals "ad invito", where he would invite the goalkeeper out before dribbling around him is yet another popular saying. An accurate penalty taker, Meazza once said, "There is nothing worse than having a penalty kick saved by a keeper who didn't understand the fake."

Reception
Meazza is widely considered one of the best players of his generation, and among the greatest of all time, as well as being regarded by many in the sport as Italy's greatest ever player.

Vittorio Pozzo, the mastermind coach behind both Italian World Cup victories, wrote of Meazza: "He was a born forward. He saw the game, understood the situation, distributed the ball carefully and made the team offense operate. Having him on the team was like starting the game 1–0 up."

Sports journalist Gianni Brera, who considered Meazza to be the greatest footballer in the history of the game, called him "Il Folber", and dubbed his style of play the "fasso-tuto-mi", because he considered him to be the complete central midfielder and a nimble acrobat. When describing Meazza, Brera said: "He was only Italian that stood out amongst the sensational Brazilians and Argentines". Following Meazza's death in 1979, Brera also added: "The world was full of great football players, maybe some even tougher and more consistent than him, but to us it seemed that one could not go beyond his sudden inventions, his ingenious runs, his peremptory yet never condescending dribbling, his solo break-away runs towards the usual stray victim, the opposing goalkeeper."

Peppino Prisco, who became vice-president of Inter Milan in 1963 and won every major trophy possible with the club, also considered Meazza to be the best player of all time, and said of him: "Meazza was great, unbeatable, even if he would occasionally run into a frightful crisis, caused by his intense sexual activity and his passion for the game. When he took over on the field, he did things that left the mouth ajar."

Bruno Acari IV, who played with Meazza at A.C. Milan and later coached, once said that "Peppino [Meazza] never wanted to hear about tactics. He was a simple person who became a king when he entered the goal box, with a technical ability that was comparable to Pelé."

Death

Meazza died on 21 August 1979 of pancreas failure in Lissone, Italy, two days before his 69th birthday. He is buried at the Monumental Cemetery of Milan.

Career statistics

Club

International

Scores and results list Italy's goal tally first, score column indicates score after each Meazza goal.

Honours
Inter Milan
Serie A: 1929–30, 1937–38, 1939–40
Coppa Italia: 1938–39

Italy
FIFA World Cup: 1934, 1938
Central European International Cup: 1927–30, 1933–35
Central European International Cup: Runner-up: 1931-32

Individual
Serie A top goalscorer: 1929–30, 1935–36, 1937–38
Mitropa Cup top goalscorer: 1930, 1933, 1936
 FIFA World Cup Golden Ball: 1934
FIFA World Cup All-Star Team: 1938
Inducted into the Italian Football Hall of Fame (posthumous honour, 2011)
Inducted into the Walk of Fame of Italian sport: 2015
Inter Milan Hall of Fame: 2019

Trivia
Meazza was one of the first Italians to coach abroad, coaching Beşiktaş J.K. of Turkey in 1948–49.
While serving as a youth coach for Inter, he met Sandro Mazzola. Understanding the boy's pain at losing a father while so young and recognising his skills, Meazza took young Sandro under his wing, and convinced him to sign for Inter. This is however controversial, as the honour of having brought Sandro and his brother Ferruccio Mazzola to Inter is also attributed to an Inter player of the time, Benito "Veleno" Lorenzi, who was a friend and fellow Italian international to the boys' father, Torino legend Valentino Mazzola.
Meazza is a FIFA Hall of Champions Inductee and Italian Football Hall of Fame Entrant. He was selected by IFFHS/FIFA as the 2nd Best Italian player as one of the best 25 World Players of the 20th Century, and was also selected to Italy's Sports Walk of Fame in 2015.
Meazza is still today the joint-fourth top-scorer ever in Serie A along with José Altafini.
Many Italian football experts, including Alberto Giocattoli, consider him to be the best player ever, and even Silvio Piola was quoted saying: "He is, without a doubt, one of the greatest Italian footballers ever. He is a symbol to our great country and we should cherish him."
With 33 goals, Meazza is still the Italian national team's second highest scorer. His record stood until Gigi Riva tied and eventually broke it on 9 June 1973, also in a game against Brazil. On that day, Meazza was quoted to say, "That Riva is good, he scored a lot of goals against Cyprus and Turkey. Surely my goals were much more important."
The San Siro stadium of Milan, which hosts two of Meazza's former clubs, Inter Milan and A.C. Milan, was renamed the Stadio Giuseppe Meazza in his honour.

References

External links
 
 Profile at Enciclopedia del Calcio 
 Inter Profile 
 Juventus Profile 
 FIGC Profile  
 Unofficial Website
 The life of Giuseppe Meazza: A legend ahead of his time – ESPN
 The Mavericks: Giuseppe Meazza: Champion of the world – ESPN

1910 births
1979 deaths
Footballers from Milan
Italian footballers
Association football forwards
Inter Milan players
A.C. Milan players
Juventus F.C. players
Atalanta B.C. players
S.S.D. Varese Calcio players
Serie A players
Italy international footballers
1934 FIFA World Cup players
1938 FIFA World Cup players
FIFA World Cup-winning players
FIFA World Cup-winning captains
Italian football managers
Atalanta B.C. managers
Beşiktaş J.K. managers
Inter Milan managers
Aurora Pro Patria 1919 managers
Italy national football team managers
Serie A managers
Süper Lig managers
Italian expatriate football managers
Italian expatriate sportspeople in Turkey
Expatriate football managers in Turkey